The People's Progressive Party (myPPP) was a de-registered multiracial political party in Malaysia which was one of the component members of the National Front or Barisan Nasional coalition from 1973 to 2018.

The party has two distinct phases - the first as a respected opposition party from the 1950s to the 1970s when its stronghold was Perak and it led the administration of Ipoh. The second was as a minor party in the Barisan Nasional coalition that only won a single parliamentary seat in more than four decades and was riddled with factional disputes.

After losing the 2018 election, the party has been split into two factions – one led by Maglin Dennis D'Cruz who supported myPPP remaining part of the BN coalition and the other led by party president M. Kayveas who insisted on myPPP leaving the BN coalition. The latter emerged victorious in the immediate power struggle and myPPP subsequently exited the Barisan Nasional coalition. The Registrar of Societies has deregistered MyPPP, which is facing leadership problems, effective Jan 14, 2019.

History
PPP was formed in 1953 by the Seenivasagam brothers mainly as an opposition party to the Alliance; the party's first president was Kanagaratnam Pillai with the Seenivasagam brothers as senior office bearers. It was a hugely popular party upon inception, particularly due to the popularity of the brothers who spoke up for justice, equality and the common man.

For a short period in 1954, PPP joined the ruling Alliance with UMNO, MIC, and MCA (which would later become the Barisan Nasional), but withdrew in 1955 over disagreement with the Alliance on allocation of seats, to become an opposition party again. In 1969, as a strong opposition party, PPP was nearly able to form the Perak State Government, but fell short of just 2 seats in combination with the opposition to form the state assembly when 2 of its members crossed over. The success of PPP was mainly due to the Chinese vote, though many of the top leaders then were Indians.

In 1973, PPP became one of the founding members of the National Front. It was brought into the National Front to keep the Indian and Chinese vote, especially after the 1969 racial riots.

However, joining the coalition would prove its undoing as it lost nearly all its seats when it contested under the Barisan Nasional ticket in the 1974 General Elections. This was mainly due to Chinese anti-establishment feeling that was prevailing at that time. Many PPP stalwarts transferred their allegiance to the DAP during that time.

Following the loss of its final parliamentary seat in 1978, the party descended into factionalism and was on the verge of disbanding.

However PPP enjoyed a renaissance of sorts under the leadership of M. Kayveas, who rebranded the party and boosted its membership to more than 500,000 with a network of over 3000 branches throughout the country. All registered members carry a membership card signed by the President; the President's card is signed by the Secretary General. As of 2006, 48% of the PPP's membership is Indian, 32% are Chinese, 13% are Malay, and the rest are of other ethnicities.

In November 2006, party president, M. Kayveas, proposed a merger between the PPP and another Barisan Nasional party, the Parti Gerakan Rakyat Malaysia. Koh Tsu Koon, Gerakan's Deputy President, welcomed the suggestion.

The 2008 Malaysian General Elections saw the party being decimated. However the party retained its representation in the Senate and was later allocated a Deputy Minister post occupied by T. Murugiah.

In the aftermath of the 2018 Malaysian General Elections, the party under President M. Kayveas announced myPPP's exit from the Barisan Nasional coalition after its loss of power in the election. There was a subsequent power struggle between the "remain" and "leave" factions of myPPP led by Maglin Dennis D'Cruz and M. Kayveas respectively. The latter emerged victorious in the power struggle and the attempted usurpers were stripped of their party membership and expelled.

Chronology
 1953: PPP was formed under the name 'Perak Progressive Party' to participate in the political future of the impending independence of Malaya.
 1954: PPP became a component of the Alliance. It won a seat in the Ipoh Town Council.
 1955: PPP withdrew from the Alliance before the 1955 Federal Legislative Council Elections due to non-allocation of seats for PPP.
 1956: To reflect a national image, the party's name was changed to People's Progressive Party.
 1957: Party president, D. R. Seenivasagam won the by-election for the Ipoh Parliamentary seat and became PPP's first Member of Parliament.
 1959: PPP won 4 parliamentary and 8 state assembly seats in the 1959 general election.
 1960: PPP won 1 more Parliamentary seat making it 5 MPs in parliament. PPP consolidated its position in Ipoh and turned Ipoh Municipality into an exemplary model of local administration.
 1964: PPP won 2 parliamentary and 6 state seats in the 1964 general election.
 1969: Party president and prime mover, D. R. Seenivasagam, died, and the leadership of the party was taken over by co-founder S. P. Seenivasagam. Despite the change of leadership, PPP went on to win 4 parliamentary seats and 12 state assembly seats in the 1969 General Election. The opportunity to form the Perak State Government slipped away due to a shortage of 2 seats.
 1972: PPP charted a new milestone by making a decision to join the Barisan Nasional. The decision was based on the belief that for the country to achieve political, social and economic stability, parochial and narrow party interests must be given up for a national multi racial outlook.
 1974: PPP contested under Barisan Nasional symbol and won 1 parliamentary and 2 state seats in the 1974 general election.
 1975: Party president S. P. Seenivasagam died and Mr. Khong Kok Yet became president.
 1978: S. I. Rajah was elected president.
 1982: Paramjit Singh was elected president.
 1985: Tee Ah Chuan took over the party presidency after Paramjit Singh stepped down.
 1986: Paramjit Singh became president again following the resignation of Tee Ah Chuan.
 1988: Mak Hon Kam became president after a private deal with Paramjit Singh. Following a court injunction against Mak Hon Kam, S. I. Rajah became Acting President. The court subsequently decided that the Registrar of Societies should determine a legitimate leader.
 1993: M. Kayveas became president following S. I. Rajah's retirement from active politics.
 1994: The Registrar of Societies decided and recognised M. Kayveas as the lawful president.
 1995
 19 March: An Extraordinary Delegates Conference was held and the following were unanimously adopted:
 The party Logo, which is a six pointed red star, be changed to a six pointed blue star with the letters PPP in the center of the star.
 The national president is the only spokesman for the party.
 Branch membership to be reduced to 27 from the current number of 50.
 To update the Registry of members and Membership Cards be issued and ensure active membership participation.
 26 March: M. Kayveas attended the First Barisan Nasional Convention and signed the Barisan Nasional Charter as the National President of PPP.
 12 April: Prime Minister and Barisan Nasional chairman launched the new logo of PPP.
 25 April: PPP actively participated in the General Election extending their fullest support to all Barisan Nasional candidates.
 5 June: The Registrar of Societies was sued for having made a decision in favour of M. Kayveas.
 5 October: The court accepted M. Kayveas and his CEC to intervene in the suit.
 21 October: The Registrar of Societies confirmed that until further notice of its decision, M. Kayveas and his CEC should remain the only legal office bearers of the party.
 1999
 18 September: An attempt was made by a group of expelled members to challenge the leadership of PPP via a ruling from the Seremban High Court. It was subsequently nullified on 14 October 1999 by the Court of Appeal which decided in favour of M. Kayveas' leadership of the PPP.
 2000
 6 December: As promised by the then Prime Minister Tun Dr. Mahathir Mohamad, M. Kayveas was appointed Senator in the Dewan Negara.
 2001
 30 January: Appointment of the party President as a Deputy Minister in the Ministry of Housing and Local Government.
 27 May: A  land was donated to PPP by Hua Yang Development Sdn Bhd for the purpose of setting up an Institution of Higher Learning. The signing ceremony was held in the Ipoh City and Country Club.
2005
 24 September: Kayveas retained his position unopposed after only one nomination was submitted for the president's post.
2008
 March: Kayveas lost his federal seat. PPP's future was widely questioned.
2009
 4 April: Opposition Leader Anwar Ibrahim announced that People's Progressive Party (PPP) vice-president V. Nagarajan along with 11 of the party's divisions would be defecting to People's Justice Party.
2009
25 June: Kayveas announced his new line for the supreme council for the term 2009–2014. He also appointed three vice-presidents: Loga Bala, M. Gandi, and Nik Safiea; Treasurer Ghana; and Information Chief A. Chandrakumanan from the Federal Territory.
2009
Kayveas announced new Youth Chief Jamal Gulhamhan and Putera Chief R. Suthesan from Johor.
2009
12 August: M. Kayveas was the valid People’s Progressive Party president while sacked youth chief T. Murugiah’s appointment as president at a 24 May Emergency General Meeting (EGM) was invalid, the Registrar of Societies (ROS) had decided. Murugiah’s sacking had also been found to have been conducted according to provisions in the party constitution and was therefore deemed valid.
2014 PPP got more Counselor posts in local government and 2 Senator Post with 1 Deputy Minister.
2014
30 November: M. Kayveas announced his new line for the supreme council for the term 2014-2019 who have won uncontested. Five vice-presidents won uncontested Loga Bala Mohan, A. Chandrakumanan, Maglin Dennis D'Cruz, Ong and Eleyappan.
2015
15 November: M. Kayveas announced rebranding of Party from PPP to My PPP (#myPPP) with new tagline "Proud to be a Malaysian (#P2baM).
2018
25 April: M. Kayveas was expelled from myPPP. He lost his party membership and all positions in the party.
26 May: An AGM was organised at Putra World Trade Center with Datuk Seri Maglin Dennis D’Cruz being appointed as President, Datuk Loga Bala Mohan Jeganathan being appointed as Senior Vice President and Datuk Dr Siva Kumar being appointed as Vice President. Maglin decided that the party had always remained in Barisan Nasional while M. Kayveas disputed his ouster as illegal and instigated by UMNO and announced that the party pulled out of BN.
27 May: Another AGM was held by M. Kayveas, who at the general meeting displayed a letter issued on 18 May by the Registrar of Societies acknowledging him as the legitimate myPPP President. He claimed that he had about 6,000 signatures from supporters nationwide who supported his presidency.
2019
14 Jan: The Registrar of Societies (RoS) has deregistered MyPPP, both factions in dispute were informed. Party has 30 days to appeal.

Representatives

Dewan Undangan Negeri (State Legislative Assembly)

List of party presidents

General election results

State election results

Elected representatives

Notes and references

Other references
 Pillai, M.G.G. (3 November 2005). "National Front parties were not formed to fight for Malaysian independence". Malaysia Today.

External links
 First version website
 
 People's Progressive Party Singapore Elections

Defunct political parties in Malaysia
1953 establishments in Malaya
Political parties established in 1953